Join or Die with Craig Ferguson is an American panel show hosted by Scottish-American comedian Craig Ferguson. The sole season, consisting of 22 episodes, began airing on History on February 18, 2016. The show features Ferguson and a panel of special guests including comedians, actors and academics discussing unorthodox and provocative historical topics.

The title of the show refers to the well-known 1754 political cartoon of the same name, which was created by Benjamin Franklin and became a symbol of colonial freedom during the American Revolutionary War. Ferguson also got the cartoon tattooed on his arm when he became an American citizen.

Production
Individual episodes cover topics such as bad medical ideas, worst political blunder, most influential drug, most influential band, greatest Founding Father, and history's biggest frenemies. Ferguson and a three-guest panel (usually consisting of scholars, comedians and people who Ferguson "talked to, liked, and respected" during his time as host of The Late Late Show with Craig Ferguson) conduct a humorous discussion about six candidates for the title in question. Viewers are invited to vote for their top choice on Twitter, and once the panel has narrowed the field from six candidates to two, the studio audience decides the winner by majority vote.

Each episode starts with a humorous monologue by Ferguson; the first 13 episodes also end with a more contemplative one in which he relaxes on the set with his suit jacket, vest, and tie removed.

During the February 24, 2016 episode of the online show Larry King Now, Ferguson told host Larry King that 22 episodes of Join or Die had already been produced. He added that the History Channel had placed an order for additional episodes. However, on March 31, 2017, during an episode of Ferguson's new Sirius XM radio show on which King was a guest, he stated that the show had been cancelled.

The final episode of the season, "History's Biggest Douchebag", was scheduled for June 16, 2016, but it was removed from the day's schedule. "History's Biggest Douchebag" aired July 28, 2016 on History Canada.

Episodes

References

External links 

2010s American comedy game shows
2010s American late-night television series
2016 American television series debuts
History (American TV channel) original programming
English-language television shows